Hatné is a village and municipality in Považská Bystrica District in the Trenčín Region of north-western Slovakia.

History
In historical records the village was first mentioned in 1321.

Geography
The municipality lies at an altitude of 390 metres and covers an area of 5.435 km². It has a population of about 564 people.

Genealogical resources

The records for genealogical research are available at the state archive "Statny Archiv in Bytca, Slovakia"

 Roman Catholic church records (births/marriages/deaths): 1756-1895 (parish B)

See also
 List of municipalities and towns in Slovakia

References

External links

 
 http://www.statistics.sk/mosmis/eng/run.html 
Surnames of living people in Hatne

Villages and municipalities in Považská Bystrica District